C.B. Forrest is a Canadian mystery writer, general fiction writer and poet.

The first novel in his mystery series featuring detective Charlie McKelvey is the critically acclaimed The Weight of Stones, shortlisted for the Arthur Ellis Award for best first novel.  The second in the series, Slow Recoil, was released in fall 2010 by Dundurn Press, and was nominated for Best Novel in the Arthur Ellis Awards. The third novel in the series, The Devil's Dust, was released in 2012 to strong reviews. The Governor General Award Winner Tim Wynne-Jones called it "a beautifully crafted novel." 
 
His short fiction, The Lost Father, won an award in the Canadian Authors' Association Short Story Contest in 2004. In 2001, his novella titled Coming To was adapted to the stage and showcased at the Factory Theatre during Toronto's Summerworks festival. He wrote songs for the performer Paula Waite, as well as songwriting duties for the band The Henrudys, including 'Another Mile' and 'Better Than I Am' as featured on CBC.

His poetry has appeared in various publications, such as Contemporary Verse 2, Bloodlotus Journal, Bywords Quarterly Journal and Ascent Aspirations, and has earned praise from writers such as George Elliot Clarke and Stephen Reid.
"

Forrest is a member of Crime Writers of Canada and Capital Crime Writers.

Personal life
Forrest began his career in journalism and now works in communications and marketing. In 1998, he studied under the author and poet B.W. Powe as a student of the Humber School for Writers.

He lives in Calgary where he is last reported to be working on several new pieces of long fiction.

List of publications

Novels
Chasing Pace, 2005 (out of print)
The Weight of Stones,  RendezVous Crime (Napoleon & Company) 2009  
Slow Recoil, Dundurn, 2010 
The Devil's Dust, Dundurn, 2012

Novellas
Coming To

Poetry
White Out in Contemporary Verse 2
Bloodlotus Journal
Bywords Quarterly Journal
Post it Note for a Daughter in Ascent Aspirations

References

  Ascent Aspirations with C.B. Forrest
  The Globe and Mail Review Book Section. review of C.B.Forrest
 CBC Radio, All in A Day Book recommendation for The Weight of Stones
  Contemporary Verse 2,  WhiteOut by C.B. Forrest
  Ascent Aspirations Post It Note for a Daughter by C.B. Forrest
 Collections Canada, Library and Archives Canada book listings for C.B. Forrest
 Crime Writers of Canada profile on C.B. Forrest
 C.B. Forrest news article from Your Ottawa Region announcing 2010 shortlist for the national mystery award, The Arthur Ellis.

External links
   Official C.B. Forrest Website
  C.B. Forrest bio on publisher Napoleon and Company website
    Mystery Author Bibliographies bio of C.B. Forrest

Living people
Year of birth missing (living people)
Canadian mystery writers
Canadian male novelists
Writers from Ontario
Canadian male short story writers
University of Toronto alumni
Humber College alumni
20th-century Canadian poets
Canadian male poets
21st-century Canadian poets
21st-century Canadian novelists
21st-century Canadian short story writers
20th-century Canadian short story writers
20th-century Canadian male writers
21st-century Canadian male writers